Eaton is a small village within the parish of Rushton, about two miles from the town of Tarporley.

The village contains the Jessie Hughes Village Hall, Eaton Primary School and the church of St Thomas.

Jessie Hughes Village Hall
The original Jessie Hughes Village Hall was opened on 26 September 1926. The main instigator in building the hall was Mrs Jessie Hughes, the wife of the Rector of Tarporley. At the time she was the president of the Women's Institute and played a pivotal role in raising money for the village hall to be built. She died in 1928, but her work is still remembered through an inscribed stone reading "This stone was laid by Jessie L Hughes 1926". The building fell into disrepair and was rebuilt in 2008. The replacement building retained the name Jessie Hughes Village Hall following a local ballot, and was joint winner of the Cheshire Pride Community Project Award in 2008.

See also

St Thomas' Church, Eaton

References

Villages in Cheshire
Former civil parishes in Cheshire
Cheshire West and Chester